Licking Creek may refer to:

Licking Creek (Potomac River), a stream in Pennsylvania
Licking Creek (West Virginia), a stream in West Virginia
Licking Creek Township, Fulton County, Pennsylvania

See also
Licking River (disambiguation)